The Indian Sports Club is a sports venue and Indian association in Blantyre, Malawi. The club was founded in 1914.

In November 2019, it was selected to host two matches of the 2019 Kwacha Cup, a Twenty20 International (T20I) cricket series between Malawi and Mozambique.

The ground has also hosted the 2015 domestic championship and a six-nations tournament in 2016. Local company United General Insurance donated K390,000 to upgrade the ground to host the international competition.

See also
 Malawi national cricket team

External links
Cricinfo Profile

References

Sport in Malawi